Antelope Valley is a region of California, in the US.

Antelope Valley may also refer to:

Other places

Nevada
 Antelope Valley (California-Nevada)
 Antelope Valley (Elko-White Pine Counties)
 Antelope Valley (Eureka County)
 Antelope Valley (Lander County)
 Antelope Valley (Nevada)

Utah
 Antelope Valley (southwest Millard County, Utah)

Wyoming
 Antelope Valley-Crestview, Wyoming

Educational organisations
 Antelope Valley College, in Lancaster, California
 Antelope Valley High School, in Lancaster, California

See also